The 2015 San Diego State Aztecs football team represented San Diego State University in the 2015 NCAA Division I FBS football season. The Aztecs were led by fifth-year head coach Rocky Long and played their home games at Qualcomm Stadium. They were members of the West Division of the Mountain West Conference. They finished the season 11–3, 8–0 in Mountain West play to become West Division Champions. They represented the West Division in the Mountain West Championship Game where they defeated Mountain Division representative Air Force to be crowned Mountain West champions. They were invited to the Hawaii Bowl where they defeated Cincinnati.

Schedule

Schedule source:

Game summaries

San Diego

at California

South Alabama

at Penn State

Fresno State

at Hawaii

at San Jose State

Utah State

at Colorado State

Wyoming

at UNLV

Nevada

Air Force–Mountain West Championship Game

Cincinnati–Hawaii Bowl

References

San Diego State
San Diego State Aztecs football seasons
Mountain West Conference football champion seasons
Hawaii Bowl champion seasons
San Diego State Aztecs football